Transperth Train Operations is a division of the Public Transport Authority of Western Australia. It is responsible for operating Perth’s urban passenger rail system, as part of the Transperth network.

Over the last three decades the rail network has undergone rapid expansion. Between 1981 and 2016 the network tripled in route length and was electrified. The Northern Suburbs Railway was opened in 1993 and was progressively extended, while the new  Mandurah Line was opened in 2007. Rail patronage over this period grew from just 6.5 million passengers in 1981 to 60.6 million in 2017–18. The 
Airport Line was opened on 9 October 2022.

Perth's rail network is a commuter rail service that connects its suburbs with the city centre. It is notable within Australia, however, for its high frequency of services and high average speeds. Its main hub is Perth railway station, which serves all Transperth rail lines in the central business district.

There are currently several large extensions to the network either under construction or planned, including the  Morley-Ellenbrook Line and Thornlie–Cockburn link, under the Metronet expansion project.

History

Infrastructure
The Fremantle to Guildford line commenced operating as a steam-powered service in March 1881, followed by the Perth to Armadale line in May 1889, and the Perth to Joondalup line (now Butler) in 1993 and the Perth to Mandurah line in December 2007. The Fremantle line service ceased in September 1979 but was reinstated in July 1983. Diesel trains were used on the rail network until the three lines then in service, the Armadale, Fremantle and Midland, were electrified in the early 1990s.

The first service with the A-series train was introduced in September 1991, with regular services beginning on the Armadale line on 7 October 1991. The Midland and Fremantle lines commenced service with the then-new A-series trains in December 1991.

The conversion from diesel to electric trains was accompanied by many upgrades to the rail network, such as upgrades to stations and tracks, and the cost of the undertaking was estimated at $109 million.

Northern Suburbs Transit System

The Northern Suburbs Transit System was the name given to the project to provide high-speed passenger rail services to the northern corridor of metropolitan Perth. To service the expanding northern suburbs, Joondalup line was built in the median of the Mitchell Freeway in the early 1990s, after several years of planning. The line was later extended to Currambine in 1993, to Clarkson in 2004 and Butler in 2014.

Mandurah Line 

Legislation for the construction of the Mandurah Line was passed in December 1999. The original proposed route branched from the Armadale line at Kenwick, and then ran alongside the freight lines until Jandakot where it would run in the middle of the Kwinana Freeway. However, a bill passed in November 2002 after a change of state government saw that the route would start at Perth, traverse the Kwinana Freeway, and then continue along its initial route after Jandakot.

Construction of the line started in February 2004 and it opened on 23 December 2007.

Thornlie Spur
Because the government did not begin its review of the Mandurah Line masterplan until after construction had begun, the tunnel under the Roe Highway had already been constructed. To make use of the new tunnel, the government decided to convert this section into a small spur line to Thornlie.

It was decided that Armadale trains would alternate with Thornlie trains, with the Thornlie trains stopping at all stations and Armadale trains only stopping at Oats Street and Cannington stations. Thornlie station opened on 7 August 2005.

New MetroRail

In 2003, the government launched the New MetroRail program as the official name of the upgrades to the rail network. This program included the following projects:

Extension of the Joondalup line to Clarkson and the construction of a new Currambine station.
Construction of Nowergup railway depot.
Purchasing 93 B-series carriages to service the Clarkson and Mandurah lines. These railcars would be configured as 31 three-car sets.
Construction of the Thornlie line and Armadale spur line.
Rebuilding Armadale, Bassendean and Gosnells stations in 2004/05.
New Greenwood station built in 2005 between Warwick and Whitfords to relieve the pressure on these stations.
Upgrade of West Leederville station, including a third platform, to help serve crowds from Subiaco Oval.

Airport Line

In August 2014, the government announced the  Forrestfield-Airport Link would be constructed providing a service to Perth Airport and High Wycombe. Construction commenced officially in November 2016, with the Airport Line in service on 9 October 2022.

Service
Rail services in Perth were at first operated by the Department of Works and Railways until 1890, when Western Australian Government Railways (WAGR) was established. In 1974, the suburban train network was placed under the control of the Metropolitan (Perth) Passenger Transport Trust (commonly called the MTT), which had operated Perth's buses since 1958. The MTT contracted out the operation of rail services to WAGR, trading as Westrail following 1975. On 31 August 1986, the MTT changed its trading name to Transperth. The rail system was rebranded as Fastrak in November 1992, however this name stopped being used around 1995. On 1 July 2003, Transperth merged with several other government authorities to form the Public Transport Authority. Prior to that, services were operated by the WAGR Commission's Urban Passenger Services Group, and since then, services have been operated by Transperth Train Operations.

Future expansion

Metronet 

Prior to the 2017 Western Australian state election, the then-opposition Labor Party promised a large expansion to Perth's rail network under the title Metronet. After the comprehensive victory by Labor, the Mark McGowan government established Metronet to oversee a number of projects to expand and improve the network. Projects in stage one include:

Morley–Ellenbrook Line

A rail link to Ellenbrook had been originally promised by then-Premier Alan Carpenter and Opposition Leader Colin Barnett prior to the 2008 elections, however this proposal was not realised. Mark McGowan revived the project in 2017. A business case was prepared for a new  Morley-Ellenbrook Line with stations at Morley, Noranda, Malaga, Whiteman Park and Ellenbrook, with a future station planned for Bennett Springs East. Construction started in 2021, with the line

Thornlie–Cockburn Link
Perth's first east–west rail link is planned to run between Thornlie and Cockburn Central stations, connecting the Mandurah and Armadale lines. This proposal involves  of new railway, relocating  of freight line and building two new stations. Construction started in 2020, with the line expected to open .

Yanchep Rail Extension
The Yanchep Rail Extension and the Thornlie-Cockburn Link are slated to have a combined cost of $1.1 billion. The extension started construction in 2020, with

Other Metronet projects
 Extending Armadale line services to Byford
 Relocating Midland station
 Rebuilding Bayswater station
 Building Lakelands Station and planning for Karnup station on the Mandurah line
 Removing several level crossings on the Armadale and Midland lines, in the process rebuilding Carlisle Station, Oats Street Station, Queens Park Station, Cannington Station and Beckenham Station and closing Welshpool Station
 Designing and manufacturing 41 new six-car C-series trains

Other proposals

Circle Routes
The original Metronet plan promised by WA Labor proposed the creation of two circle routes linking what is now High Wycombe Station to Thornlie Station following the freight rail line, then following that freight rail line to Fremantle Station creating a southern circle line. This plan likewise identified a second circle route splitting from the under construction Noranda Station following the median of the Reid Highway to link with the Joondalup Line at Balcatta.

The Infrastructure WA State Infrastructure Strategy published in 2022 calls for the State Government to investigating the feasibility of these long-term major projects the East Wanneroo Rail Link, Bunbury Faster Rail and Perth
metropolitan orbital rail route.

East Wanneroo Line
The original Metronet plan promised by WA Labor also proposed the creation of a branch off of their proposed northern circle to Wanneroo. In 2018 work was commissioned to identify an East Wanneroo Rail alignment as part of the East Wanneroo Structure Plan. These planning documents identify the railway splitting from the Morley-Ellenbrook Line after Noranda, travelling through East Wanneroo and connecting to the Joondalup Line at Clarkson Station. Stops are proposed in the Structure Plan at Gnangara and East Wanneroo.

The Infrastructure WA State Infrastructure Strategy published in 2022 likewise identified the need for the State Government to investigating the feasibility of the East Wanneroo Rail Link.

Extension to Mundijong and Pinjarra
WA Labor's original Metronet plan further proposed duplication and electrification of the South Western Railway, Western Australia to Pinjarra. The Byford Rail Extension project definition plan identifies future construction of electrified rail line south to Mundijong.

South Perth station
A station in South Perth on the Mandurah Line has been proposed since 2010 to serve Perth Zoo and the City of South Perth as a bus-rail interchange. In 2019, South Perth MLA John McGrath made renewed calls to plan and build the station.

Suburban services
The Transperth train system is generally regarded as a commuter rail system.

Routes

Transperth runs six train routes along five train lines that converge at Perth railway station, with two spur lines. These lines are:
 Armadale/Thornlie line – goes in a south-east direction to Armadale. The Australind continues along the same track to Bunbury. A spur line to Thornlie station opened on 8 August 2005.
Fremantle line – goes in a westerly direction towards Fremantle. Major stations include Subiaco and Claremont. When trains arrive at Perth station they continue through to the Midland Line.
Joondalup line – goes in a northern direction, on the Mitchell Freeway central reservation, before moving eastward near Eddystone Avenue through to Joondalup, then returning to the Mitchell Freeway reserve and continuing towards Clarkson. The line then continues currently as a two single track split up at Nowergup depot, then merge back and continues to Butler. When trains on the Joondalup line arrive at Perth station, they continue through to the Mandurah line. Future expansion plans provide for the extension of the line to Yanchep.
Mandurah line – goes in a southward direction, on the Kwinana Freeway central reservation until Kwinana, then curving south-west towards Rockingham and then south to Mandurah. When trains on the Mandurah line arrive at Perth station, they continue through to the Joondalup line.
 Midland line – goes east towards Midland. Transwa services diverge and continue to Kalgoorlie (the Prospector) and to Merredin (the AvonLink). When trains arrive at Perth they continue through to the Fremantle Line.
 Airport line – runs from Claremont in the west, along the existing Fremantle and Midland lines, to Bayswater, via Perth, before branching off.

All of the above services except the Prospector and AvonLink run on  narrow-gauge tracks. The Prospector and AvonLink run on  tracks and takes the same route as the Midland line services. Consequently, the track between East Perth and Midland is dual gauge.

Stations 

Transperth serves the following railway stations:

Patronage

Below is the annual patronage of each railway line as of the 2020–21 financial year. Figures are provided as total boardings, which includes all fare-paying boardings and free travel on stations within the free transit zones as well as transfers between stations. The figures for rail replacement and special events services are included in the total but not allocated to any railway line.

Rolling stock

Current fleet
 43 two-car first-generation A-series EMU's/86 carriages
 5 two-car second-generation A-series EMU's/10 carriages
 31 three-car first-generation B-series EMU's/93 carriages
 15 three-car second-generation B-series EMU's/45 carriages
 22 three-car third-generation B-series EMU's/66 carriages
 10 three-car fourth-generation B-series EMU's/30 carriages 
 One GE U20C diesel-electric locomotive, classed U and numbered 201

Note: All first and second generation B-series have been upgraded and renumbered to resemble the third generation. The fourth generation is practically the same as the third.

A-series EMU
The A-series railcars are two-car electric multiple-unit's  with a driver's cab at each end. They were built by  Walkers/ABB (Sets 01 to 43) and Walkers/ADtranz (Sets 44 to 48) in Maryborough, Queensland.

Classified AEA-AEB (A for passenger, E for electric and the final letter being the car type) under the old WAGR classification system, these units were simply known as EMU's. It was not until the ordering of the first B-series, that they were given the name A series.

The A-series railcars were built for the electrification of Perth's suburban railway system in the early 1990s and the Joondalup line, which was being constructed in the same period. The first was delivered on 1 September 1990. The original order for 43 first-generation railcars were followed by an additional order for 5 second-generation railcars due to the Joondalup line exceeding passenger estimates. Delivered in 1998, the second-generation railcars differ in having LED screens and other upgrades to security and accessibility, as well being the first suburban trains to feature longitudinal seating throughout. A-series railcars can be coupled to form four or six carriage trains.

B-series EMU

Introduced in October 2004, the B-series are the newest electric railcars to operate in Perth. They were built by EDI/Bombardier Transportation in Maryborough, Queensland, and operate predominantly on the Joondalup and Mandurah lines, but can be regularly seen on the Armadale/Thornlie line for Perth Stadium event trains.

Each set consists of three carriages. The powered 'A' and 'B' cars each have a driver's cab, while the central 'T' car is entirely devoted to passengers, and supplies power from overhead lines to the powered cars. The B-series railcars operate as three and six carriage trains, with the potential for nine car trains in the future.

On 19 September 2006 Premier Alan Carpenter, announced that the Public Transport Authority would purchase another 15 new 3-car sets from the EDI-Bombardier Transportation joint venture. The first of the second generation B-series railcars were introduced on 28 June 2009 and have allowed some of the A-series railcars to be transferred to the Midland-Fremantle line.

As more B-series railcars became available with the ordering of a third generation, they allowed the remaining A-series railcars operating on the Joondalup and Mandurah lines to be redistributed to the Armadale/Thornlie, Midland and Fremantle lines, increasing total capacity for these lines.

Future fleet

41 new six-car sets are planned to enter service between 2023 and 2029 (17 for passenger growth and 24 allowing for the removal of the A-series railcars), the purchase and maintain contract for which has been won by Alstom. These railcars will be designated as C-series railcars.

Past fleet

Transperth operated diesel multiple units prior to the introduction of electric trains in 1992.
 10 ADX class, introduced starting 1959, withdrawn between 1982 and 1988
 18 ADG class, introduced in 1954, withdrawn in 1992
 4 ADH class, built for regional service in 1955/1956, transferred to metropolitan service in 1962/3, withdrawn in 1992
 10 ADK/ADB class, introduced in 1968, withdrawn in 1993 and sold to New Zealand Rail
 10 ADL/ADC class, built 1982–1985, withdrawn in 1993 and sold to New Zealand Rail

Two sets of SX carriages were leased from Queensland Rail in 1986. They were originally intended for use during the  1987 America's Cup but remained in Perth until 1991.

Following the separation from Westrail, Transperth retained an MA class diesel-hydraulic locomotive for shunting at Claisebrook depot. It was withdrawn in 2014.

Depots
Transperth Train Operations run from two main depots and one minor depot:
Nowergup Depot, between the Clarkson and Butler stations. The depot sits between the up and down tracks of the Joondalup line. This is the home depot for B-series trains and the secondary depot for the future C-series trains.
Claisebrook Depot, which is next to Claisebrook. This is the home depot for A-series trains.
A smaller depot at Mandurah has been constructed to stable B-series trains.
A Future depot at Bellevue which is after Midland station and is also a train making facility. This is the home depot for C-series trains.

See also
Commuter rail in Australia
Transperth
Public Transport Authority
Metronet

References

External links

Public transport in Perth, Western Australia
Rail transport in Western Australia